Huth may refer to:

People
 Huth (surname) (includes list of people with that name)

Places and institutions
Huth, Iran, a village in Kerman Province, Iran
Huth, Yemen, village in San'a Governorate, Yemen
Huth District, district of 'Amran Governorate, Yemen

Businesses and organisations
Frederick Huth & Co, former British bank

Miscellaneous
3203 Huth, asteroid